Ilya Kuvshinov (born 20 February 1990) is a Russian illustrator who created the character designs for Ghost in the Shell: SAC 2045 and The Wonderland (2019).

Early life
He is popular on Instagram, where he had 2 million followers as of 2022. Dai Nippon Printing hosted a VRChat virtual exhibition of Kuvshinov's illustrations in May 2019 and PIE published an artbook of his illustrations later that year. The Japanese fashion magazine An An featured his depiction of Ghost in the Shell Motoko Kusanagi in July 2020.

Career
Kuvshinov was born in Penza, Soviet Union (now Russia), where he worked in the video game industry and pursued character design on the side. Kuvshinov moved to Japan around 2015 to work full-time on anime.

References

External links 

 

1990 births
Living people
21st-century Japanese artists
21st-century Russian male artists
Ghost in the Shell anime and manga
Japanese illustrators
Russian illustrators